Robert Chamberlain may refer to:

 Robert Chamberlain (poet) (1607-1660), English poet and playwright 
 Robert N. Chamberlain (1856–1917), American lawyer and politician in New Hampshire
 Robert H. Chamberlain (1838–1910), American law enforcement officer, sheriff of Worcester County, Massachusetts

See also
 Robert Chamberlin (1920–2013), American politician